Wolfsburg Hauptbahnhof is the main station of the city of Wolfsburg in the German state of Lower Saxony. It is on the Hanover–Berlin railway and it is the last Intercity-Express stop running east before Stendal or Berlin-Spandau.

Fallersleben station is also located in the district of Wolfsburg-Fallersleben.

On 25 August 2007, the 50th anniversary of the inauguration of the station building, the station was officially renamed Wolfsburg Hauptbahnhof (main station). Years before signs in the city referred to it as the Hauptbahnhof.

History

The first station in Wolfsburg opened on 4 October 1928 in Rothenfelde. One of the signs at the station read Rothenfelde-Wolfsburg. Previously, passengers to Wolfsburg had use the stations at Fallersleben or Vorsfelde.

The first station building in the town centre, approximately at its current location, was a wooden hut, like many buildings in Wolfsburg in the town's early days. Shortly after its establishment this fell into a dilapidated condition and served as a place for forced labourers from the Volkswagen factory to sleep at night. The hut was no bigger than a small warehouse and consisted essentially of a waiting room. In contrast to the present station building, this temporary building was north of the railway tracks, next to the Mittelland Canal near the Volkswagen factory. Today, the station building is located south of the tracks on Willy-Brandt-Platz.

After the WWII 

The state of the station did not improve during the Second World War; the then city manager Dr. Dahme described it in 1947 in a letter to the Reichsbahndirektion (railway division) of Hanover as follows: "Our station is a miserable shack, which is acceptable for the needs of a Bavarian mountain village, but would under no circumstances be recognised as a railway station for a go-ahead city ..."  The desolate, temporary war state, however, lasted until 1957.

The different views of the VW factory, Deutsche Bundesbahn and the city on the site of a new station delayed the start of construction considerably. The VW factory pressed for an early start of the construction project, because in the 1950s more than 5,780 people commuted to work in Wolfsburg every day. Finally, after agreement was reached on the station's location, its construction started on 6 March 1956. A little later, it was taken into provisional operations, but it was not fully functional until the beginning of the timetable for summer 1957. The new building was officially opened by the Federal Transport Minister Hans-Christoph Seebohm on 26 August 1957.

Later the Wolfsburg train station handled interzonal traffic between the West Germany and East Germany; Wolfsburg was the last stop before the Inner German border. The next stop was Oebisfelde in East Germany. The platform premises used for this traffic is still preserved.

Current facilities

Wolfsburg station is located on the line between Hanover and Berlin. Intercity-Express services run towards Hanover, Brunswick (Braunschweig) and Berlin (each are the next ICE stop). But only every second ICE on average stops in Wolfsburg. Wolfsburg station is connected by a Regional-Express service with Gifhorn and Hanover and by another line to Brunswick and Hildesheim. In addition, Regionalbahn services run to Oebisfelde and Stendal.

The first scheduled ICE stopped in Wolfsburg on 26 September 1998. The numbers of long-distance passengers has risen continuously since then. In 2004, 6,500 long-distance passengers were counted daily, in 2006 this has risen to about 7,800. In 2008, the number was 8,500 a day (another source says 10,000).

After the station building was neglected by the city council for a long time, extensive renovations began in 2004, which were estimated to cost €1.9 million. The station received a floor designed by the French artist Daniel Buren, business premises were rebuilt and various businesses including a travel centre and a service centre for Autostadt were installed. In the spring of 2011, the station tunnel was extended to the banks of the Mittelland Canal, giving a direct connection from the city to a new waterfront development.

The station building of Wolfsburg Hauptbahnhof with its typical architecture of the 1950s is now a heritage-listed building. In 2010, a sculpture by Quinto Provenziani honouring Italian immigrants was moved to the station.

Train services

The station is served by the following services:

Intercity Express services (ICE 10) Cologne - Wuppertal - Hamm - Hanover - Berlin
Intercity Express services (ICE 10) Cologne/Bonn Airport - Düsseldorf - Essen - Dortmund - Hamm - Hanover - Berlin
Intercity services (IC 77) Amsterdam - Amersfoort - Hengelo - Osnabrück - Hanover - Berlin
Regional services  Hannover - Lehrte - Gifhorn - Wolfsburg
Regional services  Hildesheim - Braunschweig - Wolfsburg
Local services  Wolfsburg - Stendal
Local services  Wolfsburg - Magdeburg

Outside the station there is an extension for the Wolfsburg central bus station. This is the terminus of inner-city bus routes to Gifhorn, Brome, Helmstedt, Königslutter and Braunschweig (Regiobus).

References

External links 

 
 
 

Railway stations in Lower Saxony
Railway stations in Germany opened in 1929
Hauptbahnhof
Heritage sites in Lower Saxony
Transport infrastructure completed in 1957